Getaway is a song by Scottish band Texas, released on 1 August 2005 as the first single from their seventh studio album, Red Book (2005). The song was successful, peaking at number six on the UK Singles Chart and becoming the band's 12th top-10 single. "Getaway" also debuted at number six in Denmark, becoming the band's highest-charting single there, but it fell off the chart the next week. A free limited edition slip-case was made available by mail to house all three formats.

Track listings

UK CD1 and European CD single 
 "Getaway" – 3:53
 "Like an Angel" – 4:15

UK CD2 
 "Getaway"
 "Getaway" (acoustic)
 "Say"

European enhanced CD single 
 "Getaway" – 3:55	
 "Getaway" (acoustic) – 3:51	
 "Say" – 3:43	
 "Black Eyed Boy" (live on Radio 2) – 3:26

UK DVD single 
 "Getaway" (video)
 "Getaway" (audio)
 "Black Eyed Boy" (live on Radio 2)
 "Making of the Video"

Charts

Weekly charts

Year-end charts

References

2005 singles
2005 songs
Mercury Records singles
Songs written by Johnny McElhone
Songs written by Sharleen Spiteri
Texas (band) songs